Rippingale is a village and civil parish in the South Kesteven district of Lincolnshire, England. The population of the civil parish was 929 at the 2011 census.

Rippingale is part of the Ringstone in Aveland group of the Deanery of Beltisloe, Diocese of Lincoln. The vicar was the Revd Dr Lynda Pugh between 2012 and 2018. The incumbent is the Revd Neil Bullen.  St Andrew's Church dates from the fourteenth century, though the tower is later.

The village public house is The Bull Inn. A railway station on a line between Bourne and Sleaford opened in 1871 for goods and closed in 1964; regular passenger services lasted from 1872 to 1930.

Rippingale falls within the drainage area of the Black Sluice Internal Drainage Board.

South of the village is the site of Ringstone, a lost village, which dates from before the Norman conquest and which survived into the 19th century as Ringstone Hall.

Rippingale has a village design statement produced by a Village Design Statement Committee. The committee was established by parish councillor Marcus Petz to produce guidance for South Kesteven District Council (SKDC). The statement was adopted in 2002.

References

External links

Rippingale village website
Rippingale Design Statement
First Series OS map, includes Ringstone

Civil parishes in Lincolnshire
South Kesteven District
Villages in Lincolnshire